V'Keon Lacey (born August 8, 1988) is an American football wide receiver who is currently a free agent. He first enrolled at Cisco College before transferring to the Southwestern Oklahoma State University and lastly Angelo State University. He attended Arlington High School in Arlington, Texas Lacey has also been a member of the Jacksonville Sharks, Cedar Rapids Titans, San Jose SaberCats, Philadelphia Soul and Portland Thunder.

Early years
Lace played high school football for the Arlington High School Colts, earning all-district honors.

College career
Lacey first played college football in 2007 for the Cisco Wranglers of Cisco College. He transferred to play for the Southwestern Oklahoma State Bulldogs in 2008. He played for the Angelo State Rams from 2009 to 2010. Lacey started all eleven games at wide receiver his junior year in 2009, earning All-LSC South Division Offense second team honors while compiling 878 yards and ten touchdowns on 74 receptions.

Professional career

Jacksonville Sharks
Lacey signed with the Jacksonville Sharks on March 9, 2012. He was released by the Sharks on June 4, 2012. He appeared in three games as a rookie for the Sharks in 2012, recording half a tackle.

Cedar Rapids Titans
Lacey played for the Cedar Rapids Titans of the Indoor Football League during the 2013 season.

San Jose SaberCats
Lacey was signed by the San Jose SaberCats on March 5, 2013. He was released by the SaberCats on March 8, 2013.

Philadelphia Soul
Lacey played for the Philadelphia Soul in 2014, recording 447 yards and twelve touchdowns on 41 receptions. He was named the AFL Pulse Player of the Week on July 26, 2014, for recent philanthropic efforts, which include actively participating in the American Foundation for Suicide Prevention’s Out of the Darkness Walks.

Portland Thunder
Lacey signed with the Portland Thunder on January 20, 2015. He became a free agent after the 2015 season.

Tampa Bay Storm
On November 13, 2015, Lacey was assigned to the Tampa Bay Storm.

References

External links
Just Sports Stats
NFL Draft scout

Living people
1988 births
Players of American football from Texas
American football wide receivers
African-American players of American football
Cisco Wranglers football players
Southwestern Oklahoma State Bulldogs football players
Angelo State Rams football players
Jacksonville Sharks players
Cedar Rapids River Kings players
Philadelphia Soul players
Portland Thunder players
Tampa Bay Storm players
Sportspeople from Arlington, Texas
21st-century African-American sportspeople
20th-century African-American people